Urban Plaza, also known as the Urban Center Plaza, is a plaza on the Portland State University campus in Portland, Oregon, United States. It was designed by James Douglas "Doug" Macy and completed in March 2000.

Description
The plaza features a clock tower, three fountains, a clock tower, and granite sculptures by John Aiken. The Portland Streetcar runs through the plaza.

References

External links

 

2000 establishments in Oregon
Portland State University campus
Squares in Oregon